Jean-Paul Pierrat (born July 3, 1952 in Xonrupt-Longemer, Vosges) is a former French cross-country skier who competed in the late 1970s and early 1980s. He is the brother of Claude Pierrat.

Pierrat won the Marcialonga in 1977, and he won the bronze medal in the 50 km event at the 1978 FIS Nordic World Ski Championships in Lahti, becoming the first person from France to win a medal at the championships.

Pierrat's best career World Cup finish was a second in a 30 km event in Italy in 1982.

World Cup results

All results are sourced from the International Ski Federation (FIS).

World Cup standings

Individual podiums

 1 podium

References

External links

1952 births
Living people
Sportspeople from Vosges (department)
French male cross-country skiers
Olympic cross-country skiers of France
Cross-country skiers at the 1976 Winter Olympics
Cross-country skiers at the 1980 Winter Olympics
People from Saint-Dié-des-Vosges
FIS Nordic World Ski Championships medalists in cross-country skiing